James Baxendale may refer to:

 James Baxendale (footballer, born 1992), English footballer
 James Baxendale (footballer, born pre-1900), English footballer